Stroukoff can be:
Andrew Stroukoff (born 1950) American ice dancer
Michael Stroukoff (1883–1973) Russian-born American aircraft designer
Stroukoff Aircraft a former American aircraft company